Deej Fabyc is an Australian/British artist who works with what they call a "forenzic biographical" type of art, with works in performance, performance installation, combined with drawing, video, photography and objects. Their work takes up the personal is political as read and does not differentiate between art and life. They have exhibited throughout Europe, the United States and Australia since 1982. Living in London, England since 2001, and is currently an associate lecturer at Sir John Cass School of Art, Architecture & Design, London Metropolitan University.

Fabyc's work has been shown internationally in museums, galleries and artist-run spaces for the past 35 years. This body of work addresses the psychological dimensions of the personal and political experience of trauma, a sense of provisional and lo-fi is characteristic of their work. Fabyc is also Founding Director of Elastic Residence in East London.

The name "Fabyc" is an acronym meaning "Family By Choice", and they have used this name since they were nineteen because it is a gender neutral name

"Deej has a highly collaborative practice and has been a founding member of several collaborative projects including the underground feminist art collective JILLPOSTERS in Melbourne in the 1980s, and Elastic ARI Sydney 2000-2001 Elastic Residence, a London ARI 2004-11 of KISSS, an international curatorium of artists working with issues of surveillance. Since 2018 Deej has been Chair of FBI, a feminist network of artists planning work for 2019".

Biography
Fabyc was born in London and spent their early childhood in London, Ljubljana, Ireland and Islip near Oxford, before travelling to Australia by boat as they were about to start secondary school. They attended six different secondary schools in both Australia and the UK and continued this trend with their university education. Initially they started a philosophy degree with Genevieve Lloyd at ANU in Canberra and attending "Act 2 performance festival", transferring to Canberra School of Art in 1982, where they were influenced by "Act 3 performance festival" which included Jill Orr & Aleks Danko; transferring to Phillip Institute of Technology in Melbourne 1983 recalling disagreements about their use of nudity and blood in classes with John Dunkley Smith; and simultaneously working with Jillposters the legendary women's poster group located in Melbourne and building a shelta/home  on Herland in Northern NSW. Completing  a BFA at Southern Cross University in 1988 where they met Geoffrey Legge of Watters Gallery who asked them to come to Sydney and show work to the new gallery Legge Gallery, who represented their work from 1989 to 1994. The Artist was part of the underground feminist art collective JILLPOSTERS in Melbourne 1983–5.And was also involved in Megalo International Screenprint Workshop in Canberra as a community artist at this time having become interested in poster making from  time at the ANU and participation in the occupation of the Vice-Chancellors residence in 1980. Fabyc went on to exhibit at a show called Fresh Art curated by Anne Loxley and Felicity Fenner and 25 years of Performance Art in Australia at the invitation of Nick Waterlowe.

They were part of a strong group of Sydney-based artists in the 1990s including, Elvis Richardson, Mikala Dwyer, Justene Williams and emerging at that time Karla Dickens.

"Recent performances have occurred in 'How do I look' with GraceGraceGrace at Guest Projects London, Theatres of Contagion Conference at Birkbeck London, and Collaborations with Annie Sprinkle and Beth Stephens in Documenta both in Athens and Kassel. Deej has held a one-year residency bursary at Artsadmin, London and has completed residencies at Dartington School of Art, Devon, the Cite Internationale des Arts, Paris, and Rules and Regs, at A Space Gallery, Southampton. Significant performances include Details at L'abracada Festival International d'Art Contemporani, Castell de la Bisbal, Spain 2006; And She Watched, Trace Installation Artspace, Cardiff, 2005 and Kingsgate Gallery, London 2004; and in Don't Call it Performance, Centro de Arte Reina Sofía, Madrid and Centro Parraga, Murcia, Spain, 2003."

Images
 We can work it out 2002
HCV Negative 2016
Risk Management 2012
Keening after things 2006

References

External links 
http://www.fabyc.co.uk
Deej Fabyc on Artabase
Fabyc CV ARTFACTS
Deej Fabyc: Gender, Space, and Forensic Biography by Robert Preece
Cat House Camp

Australian performance artists
British performance artists
Living people
Australian video artists
British video artists
Feminist artists
British installation artists
Southern Cross University alumni
Australian contemporary artists
Year of birth missing (living people)